Bhulair Bajwa is a village in Tehsil Pasrur, Sialkot District, Punjab, Pakistan.

Villages in Sialkot District